The Norwegian–British–Swedish Antarctic Expedition (also known as NBSX or NBSAE) (1949–1952) was the first Antarctica expedition involving an international team of scientists. The team members came from Norway, Sweden and the British Commonwealth of Nations.

History
The Norwegian–British–Swedish Antarctic Expedition was the first expedition to Antarctica involving an international team of scientists. The expedition was led by John Schjelderup Giæver, a Norwegian author and polar researcher. The expedition had the goal of establishing whether climatic fluctuations observed in the Arctic were also occurring in the Antarctic. A base known as Maudheim was established on the Quar Ice Shelf along the coast of Queen Maud Land in February 1950. This expedition laid the groundwork for the following Australian expeditions to Antarctic from 1954 to the early 1960s.

Transportation
The expedition was transported aboard a 600-ton sealer named  that was powered by a German U-boat diesel engine. This ship was used in conjunction with a 24,000 ton whaling factory ship named Thorshovdi. The larger ship was needed because the Norsel was too small to carry all the needed equipment and supplies for the Antarctic expedition.

In addition to both ships, two light Auster aircraft intended for reconnaissance were included on the expedition. These were piloted by a five-man RAF team from Britain. The Norsel made three round-trips to the Antarctic, with subsequent visits accompanied by a Norwegian and a Swedish flying unit to assist with aerial photography.

Conclusions
The information obtained from the expedition helped with the further study of glaciology, meteorology, and geology. It found that the world's "sea-level was principally controlled by the state of the Antarctic ice-sheet." It also improved the understanding of the impact of the Antarctic ice-sheets on the regulation of the world's climate. It also found evidence that suggest a portion of Antarctica (Dronning Maud Land) was once joined to southern Africa. Further scientific studies have also found strong evidence that eastern Antarctica was adjacent to southern Africa until the late Jurassic period.

Personnel

 John Giaever Norwegian, leader of the wintering party
 Valter Schytt Swedish, chief glaciologist, second-in-command
 Gordon de Quetteville Robin Australian, geophysicist, third-in-command
 Nils Jørgen Schumacher Norwegian, chief meteorologist
 Gösta Liljequist Swedish, assistant meteorologist
 Ernest Frederick Roots Canadian, chief geologist
 Alan Reece British, assistant geologist
 Charles Swithinbank British, assistant glaciologist
 Nils Roer Norwegian, topographic surveyor
 Ove Wilson Swedish, medical officer
 Bertil Ekström Swedish, mechanical engineer
 Egil Rogstad Norwegian, radio operator
 Peter Melleby Norwegian, in charge of dogs
 Schølberg Nilsen Norwegian, cook

Additional members that joined at a later date:
 Stig Hallgren
 Leslie Quar
 John Jelbart
 John Snarby 
 Tom Stobart British, made the official film of the expedition.

See also
 List of Antarctic expeditions
 Maudheim medal

References

Further reading
 Giaever, J. (1969). The White Desert: The official account of the Norwegian–British–Swedish Antarctic Expedition. Greenwood Pub Group. 
 Swithinbank, C. (1999). Foothold on Antarctica. Sussex, England: The Book Guild Ltd.

External links
 Norwegian-British-Swedish Antarctic Expedition, 1949-1952
 Page for the Norwegian Maudheim medal

1949 in science
1949 in Norway
1949 in Sweden
1949 in international relations
Antarctic expeditions
United Kingdom and the Antarctic
1949 in Antarctica
1950 in Antarctica
1951 in Antarctica
1952 in Antarctica
Sweden and the Antarctic
Norway and the Antarctic
Norway–Sweden relations
Sweden–United Kingdom relations
Norway–United Kingdom relations
Expeditions from Norway
Expeditions from Sweden
Expeditions from the United Kingdom